Rait is a small village in Perth and Kinross, Scotland. The village is mainly residential with stone cottages, some modern developments and also features some single storey thatched cottages dating back to the 1700s or early 1800s which form a fermtoun. The former parish church, now ruined, was built in the Middle Ages, and abandoned in the 17th century when the parish of Rait was merged with Kilspindie. The remains of a prehistoric promontory fort lie to the east of the village. The 16th-century Fingask Castle is located to the north of the village, on the south-facing slopes of the Sidlaw Hills.

References

Villages in Perth and Kinross